A Woman as Good as Her Word (Czech: Slovo delá zenu) is a 1953 Czechoslovakian comedy film directed by Jaroslav Mach and starring Jiřina Steimarová. As was common in Eastern Bloc countries at the time the films contains elements of Socialist realism.

Cast
 Jiřina Steimarová as Jarmila 
 Rudolf Deyl as Jonás  
 Miloš Forman as Young Worker  
 Nelly Gaierová as Jakubcová 
 Antonín Holzinger as Kalous  
 Alena Kreuzmannová as Bozenka  
 Vladimír Leraus as Reditel  
 Oldřich Nový as Ludvík Zach  
 František Paul as Jakubec 
 Jaromír Spal as Jirka Zach  
 Tatána Vavrincová as inzenýrka Marie Vanková

References

Bibliography 
 Alfred Krautz. International Directory of Cinematographers Set and Costume Designers in Film: Czechoslovakia. Saur, 1991.

External links 
 

1953 films
1953 comedy films
Czech comedy films
1950s Czech-language films
Czechoslovak black-and-white films
1950s Czech films